Noo Trybe Records was an American hip hop record label established in 1994 by Eric L. Brooks and operated as a sublabel of Virgin Records. It worked with several independent hip hop labels including Rap-A-Lot Records and AWOL.

History
A portion of Noo Trybe's roster came from several artists who were absorbed from EMI when it was disbanded, which included Gang Starr and AZ. Other Virgin acts such as Shyheim, who signed with the label in 1993, were transferred to the new label.

One of the label's biggest successes was the group Luniz. On July 4, 1995, Noo Trybe released Luniz's debut studio album, Operation Stackola. The album peaked in the top 20 on the Billboard top 200, and ultimately achieved Platinum status in America.

Rap-A-Lot's distribution was absorbed by Virgin proper in 1998, and in 1999, the label was absorbed by its parent. In 2013, the trademark was acquired by Universal Music as a result of its purchase of EMI's recorded-music business.

Discography

Albums 
1994
Scarface - The Diary
1995
Luniz – Operation Stackola
1996
Shyheim – The Lost Generation
Various artists – Original Gangstas (soundtrack)
1997
3X Krazy – Stackin Chips
Big Mike – Still Serious
Luniz – Lunitik Muzik
Rappin' 4-Tay – 4 tha Hard Way
1998
AZ – Pieces of a Man
Gang Starr – Moment of Truth
Various artists – Caught Up (soundtrack)
1999
Road Dawgs – Don't Be Saprize
Gang Starr - Full Clip: A Decade of Gang Starr

External links

Hip hop record labels
American record labels
1994 establishments in the United States
1999 disestablishments in the United States
Record labels established in 1994
Record labels disestablished in 1999
EMI
Virgin Records